Caojiawan  is a station on Line 6 of the Chongqing Rail Transit system in Chongqing, China. The station, located in Beibei District north of the Jialing River, opened in 2015 as an infill station on Line 6.

For the first five years after the time of building, all three entrances surfaced in barren fields that were overgrown with weeds. In summer 2017, only one entrance was open and the station entrances became the subject of national and international attention, used as a sign of China's rapid rail expansion. The avenue around the station was mostly completed by November 2019, with it opening in 2020.

Station structure

References

Railway stations in Chongqing
Railway stations in China opened in 2015
Chongqing Rail Transit stations